Gabriel is a given name derived from the Hebrew name Gaḇrīʾēl meaning "God is my strength", or "God is a strong man" The name was popularized by the association with the archangel Gabriel.

Variants

Bengali: জিবরীল and জিব্রীল (Jibe), জিবরাঈল and জিব্রাঈল (Libra)
German: Gabriel (masculine), Gabriele (feminine), Gabi (feminine nickname)
Hungarian: Gábriel, Gábor (masculine), Gabriella (feminine), Gabi (nickname for both the feminine and masculine forms)
Irish: Gaibrial, Gaibriéil, Gaibriél
Italian: Gabriele (masculine), Gabriella (feminine)
Polish: Gabriel (masculine), Gabriela (feminine), Gabryś (masculine nickname), Gabrysia (feminine nickname), Gabi (masculine and feminine nickname)
Portuguese: Gabriel (masculine), Gabriela, Gabrielle (feminine), Biel (masculine nickname), Gabi (feminine nickname)
Romanian: Gabriel (masculine), Gabriela (feminine), Gabi (masculine and feminine nickname), Gavriil, Gavril, Gavrilă
Russian: Гавриил (Gavriil), Гаврил (Gavril), Гаврила (Gavrila); diminutives: Gavrik, Gavryusha
Serbian: Гаврило (Gavrilo); diminutives: Гаша (Gaša), Гавро (Gavro), Гајо (Gajo)
Ukrainian: Гаврило (Havrylo); diminutives: Гаврилко (Havrylko), Ганик (Hanyk)

People named Gabriel

Royal houses, nobility and clergy

 Gabriel of Kakheti (died 881), Prince and chorepiscopus (bishop) of Kakheti
 Gabriel of Melitene (died 1102), ruler of Melitene
 Gabriel von Salamanca-Ortenburg (1489–1539)
 Gabriel de la Cueva, 5th Duke of Alburquerque (c. 1515–1571)
 Gabriel, comte de Montgomery (1530–1574)
 Gabriel de Luetz (died 1553)
 Gabriel de Rochechouart de Mortemart (1600–1675)
 Gabriel de Guilleragues (1628–1684)
 Gabriel of Lencastre, 7th Duke of Aveiro (1667–1745)
 Patriarch Gabriel II of Constantinople (died 1659)
 Patriarch Gabriel III of Constantinople (reigned 1702–1707)
 César Gabriel de Choiseul (1712–1785)
 Infante Gabriel of Spain (1752–1788)
 Prince Gabriel Constantinovich of Russia (1887–1955)
 Prince Gabriel of Bourbon-Two Sicilies (1897–1975)
 Prince Gabriel of Thurn and Taxis (1922–1942)
 Gabriel (archimandrite) (1929–1995), a Georgian religious figure of the 20th century
 Gabriel de Broglie (born 1931)
 Prince Gabriel of Belgium (born 2003)

Artists and entertainers 
Gabriel Bateman (born 2004), American actor
Gabriel Braga Nunes (born 1972), Brazilian actor
Gabriel Byrne (born 1950), Irish actor
Gabriel Casaccia (1907–1980), Paraguayan novelist
Gabriel Chevallier (1895–1969), French writer and novelist
Gabriel Contino (born 1974), stage name Gabriel o Pensador, Brazilian singer-songwriter and rapper
Gabriel de Saint-Aubin (1724–1780), French draftsman, printmaker, etcher and painter
Gabriel Fauré (1845–1924), late-Romantic French composer
Gabriel García Márquez (1927–2014), Colombian novelist, winner of the Nobel Prize in Literature 1982
Gabriel Hernández (singer) (born 1979), singer, member of the band No Mercy
Gabriel Iglesias (born 1976), American comedian
Gabriel Macht (born 1972), American actor
Gabriel Morrissette (born 1959), Canadian illustrator
Gabe Saporta (born 1979), Uruguayan-American musician
Gabriel von Max (1840–1915), Austrian painter
Gabriel von Seidl (1848–1913), German architect

Athletes 

 Gabriel Agbonlahor (born 1986), English footballer
 Gabriel Arteaga (born 1976), Cuban judoka
 Gabriel Barbosa (born 1996), Brazilian footballer
 Gabriel Batistuta (born 1969), Argentine footballer
 Gabriel Cramer (born 1994), Israeli-Canadian-American baseball player
 Gabriel Davis (born 1999), American football player
 Gabriel de Moura (born 1988), Brazilian football defender
 Gabriel Deck (born 1995), Argentine basketball player
 Gabby Espinas (born 1982), Filipino basketball player
 Gabriel Eugénio Souza (born 1997), Brazilian footballer
 Gabriel Favale (born 1967), Argentine football referee
 Gabriel Enrique Gómez (1984), Panamanian footballer
 Gabriel Girón (born 1988), Mexican basketball player
 Gabriel Gonzaga (born 1979), Brazilian jiu-jitsu and UFC fighter
 Gabriel Hamer-Webb (born 2000), English rugby union player
 Gabriel Heinze (born 1978), Argentine footballer
 Gabriel Hernández (disambiguation), several athletes with one exception
 Gabriel Hernández (boxer) (1973–2001), Dominican Republic boxer
 Gabriel Jesus (born 1997), Brazilian footballer
 Gabriel "Gabe" Kapler (born 1975), American major league baseball outfielder and manager
 Gabriel Landeskog (born 1992), Swedish ice hockey player
 Gabriel Lundberg (born 1994), Danish basketball player
 Gabriel Milito (born 1980), Argentine footballer
 Gabriel Mendoza (born 1968), Chilean footballer
 Gabriel Minadeo (born 1967), Argentine field hockey player and coach
 Gabriel Monteiro Vasconcelos (born 1996), Brazilian footballer
 Gabriel Morency (born 1970), Canadian sports broadcaster
 Gabe Norwood (born 1985), Filipino basketball player
 Gabriel Obertan (born 1989), French footballer
 Gabriel Olaseni (born 1992), British basketball player
 Gabriel Paulista (born 1990), Brazilian footballer
 Gabriel Popescu (born 1973), Romanian footballer
 Gabriel Reis (born 1984), Brazilian water polo player
 Gabriel "Gabi" Teichner (born 1945), Israeli basketball player
 Gabriel Varga (born 1985), Canadian kick boxer
 Gabriel Vasconcelos Ferreira (born 1992), Brazilian footballer
 Gabriel José Ferreira Mesquita (born 1998), Brazilian footballer

Other 
 Gabriel Al-Salem (1967–2010), American businessman and author
 Gabriel Aubry (born 1975), Canadian model
 Daniel Gabriel Fahrenheit (1686–1736), European physicist, inventor, and scientific instrument maker
 Gabriel García Marquez, Literature Nobel
 Gabriel Kaplan (born 1944), American comedian and poker player
 Gabriel Marcel (1889–1973), French philosopher
 Gabriel Smith (1776–1800), leader of a slave rebellion in the United States
 Gabriel I. H. Williams, Liberian journalist
 Gabriel Weston (born 1970), English female surgeon, author and television presenter
 Gavrilo Princip (1894-1918), Bosnian Serb whose assassination of Archduke Franz Ferdinand of Austria led to the outbreak of World War I.

Fictional characters
Gabriel, a crime lord, and the recurring antagonist in the third season of the 1987 TV series Beauty and the Beast
Gabriel, the protagonist of the video game Fable: The Journey
Gabriel, one of the missing children from Five Nights at Freddy's
Gabriel, a recurring character on the television series Supernatural
Gabriel the Warrior, one of the main characters in Minecraft Story Mode
Gabriel Agreste, the main antagonist in Miraculous: Tales of Ladybug & Cat Noir, and father of Adrien Agreste
Gabriel Allon, an Israeli Mossad agent, who is the main protagonist of a series of books by Daniel Silva
Gabriel Angelos, one of the main characters in the video game series Warhammer 40,000: Dawn of War
Gabriel Ashlocke, the main antagonist of the second series of Mutant X
Gabriel Belmont, the protagonist of the video game Castlevania: Lords of Shadow and its two sequels
Gabriel Birid, the protagonist of the series Gabriel's Fire which was later revamped as Pros and Cons
Gabriel Boutin, a character in Sally Green's trilogy Half Bad
Gabriel Churchkitten, a fictional cat in the novels by Margot Austin
Gabriel Cohuelo, also known as Velocidad
Gabriel "Gabe" Duncan, one of the main characters in the Disney series Good Luck Charlie
Gabriel "Gabe" Goodman, a character in the Broadway musical Next to Normal
Gabriel Gray, the real name of the character Sylar, from the television series Heroes
Gabriel 'Gabe' Jones, a fictional character in the Marvel Comics, and a member of the Howling Commandos
The title character of Gabriel Knight, a PC game series
Gabriel Lawrence, a character from the Ghost Whisperer
Gabe Lewis, one of the supporting characters from The Office
Gabriel Logan, the protagonist of the video game series Syphon Filter
Gabriel May, the female protagonist's evil parasitic twin in James Wan's 2021 supernatural horror movie Malignant
Gabriel Oak, one of the protagonists from Thomas Hardy novel Far from the Madding Crowd
Gabriel Reyes, a playable character in the video game, Overwatch, under the alias "Reaper"
Gabriel Rorke, the antagonist of the video game Call of Duty: Ghosts
Gabriel Santiago, a fictional character in the Android: Netrunner universe
Gabriel Santoro, of the novel Third and Indiana
Gabriel Stokes, a fictional character from the comic book series The Walking Dead and the TV series of the same name
Gabriel Summers, a Marvel Comics villain better known as Vulcan
Gabriel Tenma White, a character from Gabriel Dropout
Gabriel "Gabe" Ugliano, the protagonist's stepfather from Percy Jackson & the Olympians
Gabriel Van Helsing, the protagonist of the 2004 film Van Helsing
Gabriel Vaughn, the protagonist of the 2014 TV series Intelligence

References

See also

Gabriela (disambiguation)
Gabriella (disambiguation)
Gibril (disambiguation)
Jibril (disambiguation)

English given names
English masculine given names
German masculine given names
Romanian masculine given names
French masculine given names
Hebrew masculine given names
Spanish masculine given names
Modern names of Hebrew origin
Theophoric names